William Woodbridge McNair (January 4, 1836 – September 15, 1885) was a lawyer and Democratic politician who served as mayor of St. Anthony, Minnesota.

Life and career
McNair was born in Groveland, New York to William Wilson McNair and Sarah McNair (née Pierepont, a descendant of James Pierpont). He attended schools in Genesee, New York and at Canandaigua Academy before moving to Racine, Wisconsin in 1855 to study law under James Rood Doolittle. After two years he moved to Minneapolis where he continued his studies and gained admission to the bar in 1857.

From 1859 to 1863 McNair served as county attorney for Hennepin County, Minnesota. Thereafter McNair formed several successive legal partnerships with local legal and political figures including Eugene McLanahan Wilson, William Lochren and John Gilfillan. McNair was especially well regarded as a defense attorney (though he practiced in a variety of areas). He also held a number of political offices including two terms as mayor of St. Anthony (shortly prior to its absorption into Minneapolis) from 1869 to 1871. In 1876 he was the Democratic nominee for United States Representative but lost to Jacob H. Stewart. In 1883 he declined the nomination to run for governor.

McNair retired in 1884 and died in 1885. He is buried in Lakewood Cemetery in Minneapolis.

References

1836 births
1885 deaths
Minnesota lawyers
Minnesota Democrats
Burials at Lakewood Cemetery
People from Groveland, New York
Mayors of places in Minnesota
19th-century American politicians
19th-century American lawyers